Larry Thomas (c. 1948 – June 11, 2018) was an American political journalist and press secretary.

Early life
Thomas was born circa 1948 in San Diego, California. He graduated from San Diego State University, where he earned a bachelor's degree in journalism.

Career
Thomas began his career at United Press International, followed by KPBS and Copley Press. He later became a political journalist for The San Diego Union-Tribune.

Thomas worked as an advisor to San Diego Mayor Pete Wilson in the 1970s, followed by California Governor George Deukmejian from 1982 to 1987. In March 1987, Vice President George H. W. Bush hired him as his press secretary during his presidential campaign, but Thomas left after only three months, citing “complex personal reasons". He was also an advisor to Governor Arnold Schwarzenegger.

Thomas worked as corporate communications director for the Irvine Company from 1987 to 2007.

Death
Thomas died of cancer on June 11, 2018, at his residence in Newport Beach, California, at 70.

References

1940s births
2018 deaths
People from San Diego
People from Newport Beach, California
American political journalists
American political consultants
Deaths from cancer in California